cis-3-Hexenal, also known as (Z)-3-hexenal and leaf aldehyde, is an organic compound with the formula CH3CH2CH=CHCH2CHO. It is classified as an unsaturated aldehyde. It is a colorless liquid and an aroma compound with an intense  odor of freshly cut grass and leaves.

Occurrence
It is one of the major volatile compounds in ripe tomatoes, although it tends to isomerize into the conjugated trans-2-hexenal. It is produced in small amounts by most plants and it acts as an attractant to many predatory insects. It is also a pheromone in many insect species.

See also 
cis-3-hexen-1-ol has a similar but weaker odor and is used in flavors and perfumes.
1-Hexanol, another volatile organic compound, also considered responsible for the freshly mowed grass odor

External links
 Hexenal

References 

Flavors
Insect pheromones
Insect ecology
Alkenals